This is a list of commercial banks in Zambia 

 Absa Bank Zambia Plc
 Access Bank Zambia Limited
 Atlas Mara Bank Zambia Limited
 Bank of China Zambia Limited
 Citibank Zambia Limited
 Ecobank Zambia Limited
 First Alliance Bank Zambia Limited
 First Capital Bank Zambia Limited
 First National Bank of Zambia Limited
 Indo-Zambia Bank Limited
 Investrust Bank Zambia Limited
 Stanbic Bank Zambia Limited
 Standard Chartered Bank Zambia Plc
 United Bank for Africa Zambia Limited
 Zambia Industrial Commercial Bank Limited
 Zambia National Commercial Bank Plc

See also
List of banks in Africa

References

External links
 Bank of Zambia Website

 
Banks
Zambia
Zambia